Gunthorpe is a village and a civil parish in the English county of Norfolk. The village is 8.6 miles east north east of the town of Fakenham, 14.9 miles west south west of Cromer and 122 miles north north east of London. The nearest railway station is at Sheringham for the Bittern Line which runs between Sheringham, Cromer and Norwich. The nearest airport is Norwich International Airport.

Location
The village of Gunthorpe is situated in a shallow valley on the eastern side of the A148 King’s Lynn to Cromer road. At the centre of the village is a green where there is a convergence of five roads. In the north west of the village there is a parish church which is dedicated to Saint Mary. Close by is the old village school which was built in 1869, but now closed.

History
The villages name means 'Gunni's outlying farm/settlement'.

Gunthorpe is mentioned in the Domesday Book of 1086 where it is listed with the names of Gunatorp and Gunestorp. The first tenant was Peter de Valognes

The parish church of Saint Mary
The church was built around 1417  but has been substantially rebuilt by Frederick Preedy in the 1860s. The tower and transept are old, but much of the exterior has been refaced and the chancel is all the work of Preedy. Much of the interior dates from the same rebuild.  At the churchyard gate stands the village war memorial.

Gunthorpe Hall
Gunthorpe Hall was originally built in 1789 to the design of Sir John Soane, the architect who designed the Bank of England building in Threadneedle Street in 1778 and was renovated in 1880 by William Butterfield. The Hall is a large part Georgian, part Victorian Hall and at one time had forty rooms and a separate stable block and coach house. The hall is a Grade II listed building.

Notation
The Acute Stroke Unit in Norfolk and Norwich University Hospital is named after this village.

References

http://kepn.nottingham.ac.uk/map/place/Norfolk/Gunthorpe

External links

North Norfolk
Villages in Norfolk
Civil parishes in Norfolk